Abubakar Bashir Abdulkarim also known as Abubakar Bashir Maishadda (born 2 August 1988) is Nigerian film producer who works in kannywood film industry. He is the founding chairman of Maishadda Global Resources LTD, Abubakar Bashir Maishadda has produced numbers of films under his banner in which he featured Kannywood stars such as Ali Nuhu, Sadiq Sani Sadiq, Maryam Yahaya, Yakubu Muhammed, Rahama Sadau in films like Takanas Ta Kano (2014), Daga Murna (2015), Wutar Kara (2019), Hafeez (2019), Mujadala (2019),  Mariya (2019), Ana Dara Ga Dare (2018) and Hauwa Kulu (2019), and many other production companies such as Sareena (2019), and The Right Choice (2020), Abubakar Bashir Maishadda is frequently considered as “King of The Box Office”. Abubakar Bashir Maishadda have received several awards including City People Entertainment Awards 2018 and 2019, 2015 Africa Magic Viewers Choice Awards best indigenous language categories (Hausa).

Early life and background
Abubakar Bashir Maishadda was born 2 August 1988 in Dandishe, Dala local government of Kano State, he grew up in Gadon Kaya, Gwale local government of Kano State. He is a son to Alhaji Bashir Abdulkareem Maishadda and Safiya Sani Na'ibi. Abubakar Bashir Maishadda attended Shukura International Nursery and Primary School Kurna for his nursery school, he later moved to Gadon Kaya where he continued his primary school at ACE Academy, he completed his primary and secondary school education from Sheik Bashir El-rayyah School Complex. Abubakar Bashir Maishadda obtained National Diploma in Computer Science and another one in Film making from Northwest University.

Career
Abubakar Bashir Maishadda joined Kannywood film industry in 2012, he joined film industry with the help of Abubakar A.S Mai Kwai, he later met Ibrahim Bala who is also film director in the kannywood film industry, they worked together and produced film titled Ba Girma (2014) which is his first film, Abubakar Bashir Maishadda have produced more 50 films both in Hausa and English. He has collaborated with Kabiru Jammaje to produce English films such as Light and Darkness (2016)  In Search of the King (2018), This is the Way (2018). 2019 mark a turning point for Maishadda after releasing Hauwa Kulu (War against rape) (2019) in which he addressed the issue of rape, Hauwa Kulu film won best movie of the year at the 2019 City People Entertainment Awards.

In 2020, Abubakar Bashir Maishadda collaborate with Ali Nuhu and Kabiru Jammaje to produce the highest budgeted film The Right Choice (2020) in which he featured top Nollywood star.

Awards

Producer filmography

Personal life
On June 18, 2022, Maishadda married a Kannywood actress known as Hassana Muhammad.

References

External links
 .

1988 births
Nigerian male film actors
Hausa-language mass media
Living people
Male actors in Hausa cinema
21st-century Nigerian male actors
People from Kano State
Nigerian male television actors
Nigerian film producers
Nigerian chief executives
Nigerian businesspeople